Ralliart is the high-performance and motorsports division of Mitsubishi Motors. It was responsible for development and preparation of the company's rally racing and off-road racing vehicles, as well as the development of high-performance models and parts available to the public. Ralliart scaled down its business activities in April 2010, though the brand will continue to be used by Mitsubishi.

Many regional licensees were set up previously. Ralliart Europe was established as Andrew Cowan Motorsports (ACMS) Ltd in 1983 by Andrew Cowan, a driver with the Mitsubishi team who had scored their first international victory in 1972 at the Southern Cross Rally. His team mate at the same event in 1975 and '76, Doug Stewart, set-up Ralliart Australia as the official regional licensee in 1988, after 22 years of experience with the company's cars. The two have subsequently served as operational bases for Mitsubishi's global motorsport activities, and were responsible for MMC's record of achievement in off-road racing, including the 1998 Manufacturers' Championship in the World Rally Championship, four individual Drivers' Championships for Tommi Mäkinen in 1996–99, and a record twelve wins in the Dakar Rally since 1982.

The company established Mitsubishi Motors Motor Sports in Trebur, Germany in November 2002, and then consolidated the previously independent licensees under this umbrella in 2003, acquiring ACMS Ltd from Cowan while Mitsubishi Motors Australia took over Stewart's operation.

History

Revival
On May 13, 2021, Mitsubishi executives announced that they would bring back Ralliart as part of a plan.

Dakar Rally

In 2003, MMSP also purchased the Pont-de-Vaux-based SBM operation, which had been responsible for its cross country rallying activities, to form MMSP SAS.

The team used the Mitsubishi Pajero to win the Dakar Rally every year between 2004 and 2007. After the 2008 running was cancelled, the team developed a new car, the Mitsubishi Racing Lancer, for 2009, but struggled, losing the race to rivals Volkswagen. In 2009, Mitsubishi withdrew from cross-country competition.

In late 2009, Frenchman Nicolas Misslin acquired MMSP SAS and renamed it JMB Stradale Off Road.

World Rally Championship

Ralliart Europe
Mitsubishi rally driver Andrew Cowan set up Andrew Cowan Motorsports (ACMS) in 1983 as a European base for Mitsubishi's motorsports activities. Based in Rugby, Warwickshire, it evolved into Ralliart Europe, with support from Mitsubishi's high performance division.

Ralliart Europe entered the World Rally Championship full-time for the first time in 1989, with the Mitsubishi Galant VR-4. The car won in the hands of Mikael Ericsson in Finland and Pentti Airikkala in Great Britain. Mitsubishi finished fourth in the manufacturers' standings in 1989, and third in 1990. Kenneth Eriksson delivered the team its next victory in Sweden in 1991.

The team introduced the Mitsubishi Lancer Evolution for the 1993 season, but did not manage to win during the year and only scored two podium finishes. The team developed the Lancer Evolution II and introduced it half-way through the 1994 season, Armin Schwarz scoring a second-placed finish on the cars debut in Greece. The car took its first victory on the following year's Rally Sweden, with Kenneth Eriksson leading home Tommi Mäkinen.

The Lancer Evolution III was soon introduced, and enjoyed great success in hand of Eriksson in the Asia-Pacific Rally Championship, Mitsubishi's main focus at the time. Eriksson took the Evolution III to victory on the 1995 Rally Australia, a round of both championships. He finished the WRC season in third place in the standings behind the dominant Subaru World Rally Team pairing of Colin McRae and Carlos Sainz, after the Toyota Castrol Team pairing of Juha Kankkunen and Didier Auriol were excluded from the championship for running illegal turbo restrictors. In 1996, Mäkinen won five out of the nine rounds to win the Drivers' Championship.

The Lancer Evolution IV was introduced for the start of the 1997 season. Mäkinen won four out of 14 rallies to win his and Mitsubishi's second drivers' title. The car won the second and third rounds of the 1998 season, before being replaced by the Lancer Evolution V for the fifth round in Spain. As their rivals Subaru and Ford were competing with the new World Rally Car spec, Mitsubishi continued to develop their cars to the old Group A regulations. Mäkinen took the car to victory in Argentina, which then won the final four events of the season, allowing Mäkinen to win a third straight title, while Mitsubishi were finally able to take their first manufacturers' title, thanks to two victories from Richard Burns.

The team introduced the Lancer Evolution VI for the opening round of the 1999, complete with sponsorship from Marlboro. Mäkinen won in Monte Carlo on the car's debut and then again on the next round in Sweden. He picked up further wins in New Zealand and Sanremo to record a then record fourth consecutive drivers' title. In 2000, the team struggled against their rivals and their World Rally Cars, Mäkinen only winning once and finishing fifth in the standings.

Mäkinen managed to win three times in 2001, until Mitsubishi introduced the Lancer WRC in Sanremo, having continued running to the old Group A regulations even though their rivals began working with the new WRC regulations from 1997. Both Mäkinen and teammate Freddy Loix struggled with the new car, before Mäkinen suffered a heavy accident that injured his co-driver Risto Mannisenmäki. Two retirements and a sixth-placed finish from the final three rallies meant that Mäkinen missed out on winning the title.

Mäkinen left the team for Subaru for 2002, so François Delecour and Alister McRae were signed to replace him and Loix, who had moved to Hyundai. Both struggled with the car though, McRae managed a fifth-place finish on Rally Sweden, but those were the only points the team would score all season. The team finished last in the manufacturers' points, behind Skoda and Hyundai. Mitsubishi would not compete during the 2003 season as Mitsubishi restructured their motorsports activities.

MMSP

Mitsubishi consolidated their racing activities in 2003, acquiring ACMS Ltd from Cowan while Mitsubishi Motors Australia took over Stewart's operation. This followed the formation of Mitsubishi Motors Motor Sports (MMSP) GmbH in Trebur, Germany in November 2002.

The team signed experienced driver Gilles Panizzi to lead its lineup, and signed the less-experienced trio of Kristian Sohlberg, Gigi Galli and Daniel Solà to share its second car. Panizzi managed to score points on three occasions before the team reduced its programme after ten of 14 rounds, switching their focus to developing their 2005 car. The team did compete on Rally Catalunya, where both Sola and Galli finished in sixth and seventh place respectively.

Mitsubishi returned in 2005 with a developed car, the Lancer WRC05, and had signed Harri Rovanperä to drive one car on all 16 rallies, with Panizzi and Galli sharing the second car. Galli would be entered in a third car on selected events. Panizzi scored Mitsubishi's first podium finish since 2001 on the first event of the season, Monte Carlo. Rovanperä was a regular points scorer, finishing second on Rally Australia, to finish the season seventh in the drivers' standings. Galli scored points on six occasions. Mitsubishi finished fifth in the manufacturers' standings, ahead of Skoda.

At the end of 2005, Mitsubishi Motors Corporation suspended its participation in the WRC. MMSP Ltd supported Galli's Lancer WRC05 entry for the two opening rounds of 2006, in association with Ralliart Italy.

MMSP Ltd. ran two Lancer WRC05s for Toni Gardemeister and Xavier Pons on the first three rounds of the 2007 season, as well as a third car for Juho Hänninen on round three in Norway. It also ran Gardemeister on round five in Portugal alongside Armindo Araujo, and ran Gardemeister and Hänninen in Italy. It ran Urmo Aava in Greece, Finland and New Zealand, the Estonian scoring points in Finland and New Zealand.

In February 2009, MMSP Ltd operations manager John Easton completed a buy-out of the Rugby-based company to form MML Sports Ltd.

Ralliart, Inc
Mitsubishi continues to use the Ralliart name both to sell aftermarket components and as a "halo" brand for higher-performance editions of many of its models. Many of the regional licensees continue to operate. Ralliart Italy prepares Mitsubishi rally cars for Armindo Araujo and the Pirelli Star Drivers in the Production World Rally Championship (PWRC). Ralliart China hold the brand rights for the China territory. Their head office is in Hong Kong but has facilities in different cities within China. They construct competition vehicles to be used in the China Rally Championship and China Cross Country Rally Championship, sell competition parts, manage teams and offer technical consultancy to its clients.

In 2012 Benito Guerra Jr. won in México, Argentina and España rallies, plus a second place in Germany, clinching the PWRC world championship in doing so.

WRC Results

References

External links

 Official global website 

Japanese companies established in 1984
Auto parts suppliers of Japan
Mitsubishi Motors subsidiaries
World Rally Championship teams
Official motorsports and performance division of automakers
Intercontinental Rally Challenge teams